Ivan Yuryevich Veriasov (born 10 July 1993) is a Russian boxer. He competed in the 2020 Summer Olympics.

References

1993 births
Living people
People from Nakhodka
Boxers at the 2020 Summer Olympics
Olympic boxers of Russia
Russian male boxers
European Games competitors for Russia
Boxers at the 2019 European Games
Sportspeople from Primorsky Krai